Lynchellidae is a family of marine ciliates first described in 1968.

References

Ciliate families